The October Suite is an album by American jazz pianist Steve Kuhn and composer/arranger/conductor Gary McFarland featuring performances recorded in 1966 for the Impulse! label.

Reception
The Allmusic review by Thom Jurek awarded the album 4½ stars stating "it is an anomaly in the Impulse catalog of the time in that it did not pursue the free jazz realms with the vengeance that most of the label's other acts did during that year".

Track listing
All compositions by Gary McFarland

 "Remember When" - 4:52
 "St. Tropez Shuffle" - 6:22
 "One I Could Have Loved" - 7:13
 "Traffic Patterns" - 7:38
 "Childhood Dreams" - 6:34
 "Open Highway" - 6:03

Recorded on October 14, 1966 (tracks 1-3) and November 1, 1966 (4-6).

Personnel
Steve Kuhn - piano
Gary McFarland – arranger, conductor
Isadore Cohen, Matthew Raimondi - violin (tracks 1-3)
Al Brown - viola (tracks 1-3)
Charles McCracken - cello (tracks 1-3)
Don Ashworth, Joe Firrantello (aka Joe Farrell), Irving Horowitz, Gerald Sanfino - woodwinds (tracks 4-6)
Corky Hale - harp (tracks 4-6)
Ron Carter - bass
Marty Morell – drums

References

Impulse! Records albums
Gary McFarland albums
Steve Kuhn albums
1967 albums
Albums produced by Bob Thiele
Albums conducted by Gary McFarland
Albums arranged by Gary McFarland